Patricia Lynn Murray (born October 11, 1950) is an American politician and educator who has served as president pro tempore of the United States Senate since 2023. She is the senior United States senator from Washington, a seat she has held since 1993. A member of the Democratic Party, Murray was in the Washington State Senate from 1988 to 1992. She was Washington's first female U.S. senator and is the first woman in American history to hold the position of president pro tempore. 

Born and raised in Bothell, Washington, Murray graduated from Washington State University with a degree in physical education. She worked as a pre-school teacher and, later, as a parenting teacher at Shoreline Community College. A long-time advocate for environmental and education issues, Murray ran for the Washington State Senate in 1988, and defeated two-term incumbent Bill Kiskaddon. She served one term before launching a campaign for the United States Senate in 1992. She has been re-elected five times, most recently in 2022.

As a senator, Murray has been a part of party leadership since 2001, having served as chair of the Democratic Senatorial Campaign Committee, Democratic Conference secretary, and assistant Democratic leader. Before assuming her current roles, Murray previously chaired the Veterans' Affairs, Budget, and Health, Education, Labor and Pensions Committees. Murray garnered national attention in 2013, when she and Republican representative Paul Ryan announced that they had negotiated a two-year, bipartisan budget, known as the Bipartisan Budget Act of 2013. Murray is currently the fourth-most senior Senator, the second-longest serving woman to ever serve in the Senate, and the dean of Washington's congressional delegation.

Early life and education
One of seven children, Murray was born in Bothell, Washington, a daughter of David L. Johns and Beverly A. McLaughlin. Her mother was an accountant. Her father served in World War II and was awarded a Purple Heart. Her ancestry includes Welsh, Irish, Scottish, and French-Canadian. When she was a teenager, her family was forced to apply for welfare assistance when her father became disabled by multiple sclerosis. He had been the manager of a five-and-ten store. Murray attended Saint Brendan Catholic School as a young child.

Murray received her Bachelor of Arts degree in physical education from Washington State University in 1972.

Early career 
Murray was a preschool teacher for several years, and taught a parenting class at Shoreline Community College from 1984 to 1987. As a citizen-lobbyist for environmental and educational issues, Murray has said, a state representative once told her she could not make a difference because she was just a "mom in tennis shoes". The phrase stuck, and she later used it in her successful campaigns for Shoreline School District board of directors (1985–89), Washington State Senate (1989–93), and United States Senate (1993–present). Murray was successful in gathering grassroots support to strike down proposed preschool program budget cuts.

In 1988, Murray unseated two-term incumbent Republican state Senator Bill Kiskaddon.

U.S. Senate (1993–present)
Murray has served in the United States Senate since her election in 1992. For the 118th congress in 2023, she was elected president pro tempore of the Senate; the office is usually held by the senior senator of the majority party, but Senator Dianne Feinstein (also elected in 1992, who took her seat a few months prior to Murray) declined the post, leaving Murray the next in line for the position. Murray is the first woman in United States history to hold this position. As president pro tempore of the Senate, she is currently third in the United States presidential line of succession.

Murray is also the current chair of the Senate Appropriations Committee.

Elections

1992 

In 1992, Murray announced her candidacy for the U.S. Senate after The Seattle Times published a series of articles alleging that incumbent Democratic Senator Brock Adams had sexually assaulted a number of women. Adams denied the allegations, but his popularity weakened considerably and he chose to retire rather than risk losing the seat for his party. Murray defeated Congressman Don Bonker for the Democratic nomination. In the general election she defeated Republican Congressman Rod Chandler, 54% to 46%, despite being outspent by a wide margin. Chandler seemed to have the upper hand in one of the debates until he responded to Murray's criticism for spending $120,000 on congressional mailings during rising unemployment and declining family income as part of an economic recession by quoting the Roger Miller song "Dang Me." Chandler was further damaged by the unpopularity in the Pacific Northwest of President George H. W. Bush, who was largely blamed for the recession.

1998 

In 1998, Murray faced Congresswoman Linda Smith, a staunch conservative and maverick who was one of nine House Republicans to vote against confirming U.S. House Speaker Newt Gingrich in early 1997, opposed gay rights and viewed homosexuality as a "morally unfit inclination." Murray heavily outspent her and was reelected, 58% to 42%.

2004 

In 2004, Murray faced Republican U.S. Representative George Nethercutt. Term limits became an issue in the campaign, as Democrats seized on Nethercutt's broken term-limits pledge that he had made when he unexpectedly unseated Speaker Tom Foley in 1994. Nethercutt was also hampered by his lack of name recognition in the more densely populated western part of the state, home to two-thirds of the state's population. Washington has not elected a senator from east of the Cascades since Miles Poindexter in 1916. Other important issues included national security and the war in Iraq. Nethercutt supported the 2003 Invasion of Iraq, while Murray opposed it. Nethercutt was a heavy underdog from the start and his campaign never gained much traction. Murray was reelected, 55% to 43%.

2010 

The 2010 election was the first Senate election to be held under the new blanket primary since Initiative 872 had passed in 2004. In the August 17 primary, Murray appeared on the ballot alongside four other Democratic candidates, six Republican candidates, a Reform Party candidate and three independent candidates. She received a plurality, 46%, and advanced to the general election along with her main Republican challenger, former state Senator and two-time gubernatorial nominee Dino Rossi, who received 33%. Leading up to the election, several prominent Washington State newspapers endorsed Murray. Rossi conceded the election to Murray on November 4, 2010, two days after election day. She won 52.08% of the vote to Rossi's 47.37%, Murray's smallest reelection margin to date.

2016 

Murray ran for a fifth term in 2016. She faced three Democratic challengers in the August 2, 2016, primary election. In the general election, she faced King County Councilman Chris Vance. She defeated Vance, 59% to 41%.

2022 

In the 2022 election, Murray won reelection to a sixth term over Republican Tiffany Smiley.

Committee assignments

 Committee on Appropriations (Chair)
 Subcommittee on Defense
 Subcommittee on Energy and Water Development
 Subcommittee on Homeland Security
 Subcommittee on Labor, Health and Human Services, Education, and Related Agencies
 Subcommittee on Military Construction, Veterans Affairs, and Related Agencies (Chair)
 Subcommittee on Transportation, Housing and Urban Development, and Related Agencies 
 Committee on the Budget
 Committee on Health, Education, Labor, and Pensions
 Subcommittee on Children and Families
 Subcommittee on Primary Health and Retirement Security
 Committee on Veterans' Affairs

Caucus memberships
 Senate Oceans Caucus
 Senate Aerospace Caucus
Afterschool Caucuses
Congressional NextGen 9-1-1 Caucus

Legislation
On February 28, 2013, Murray introduced the Green Mountain Lookout Heritage Protection Act into the Senate. The bill would prevent the United States Forest Service from removing a building from the Glacier Peak Wilderness Area in the state of Washington unless the agency determines that the structure is unsafe for visitors. Murray argued that the bill should be passed in order to help the tourism industry in the area while protecting the lookout point in question. The bill would be "a very small step in what will be a very long recovery" and would "provide a glimmer of hope for the long-term recovery of this area", she said, referring to the area's recovery from the casualties and damage caused by the 2014 Oso mudslide. The bill passed both the House and the Senate.

Political positions

Abortion 
Murray supports abortion rights. She opposed the Pain-Capable Unborn Child Protection Act, a bill criminalizing abortions after 20 weeks of pregnancy, saying on the Senate floor: "I oppose the fact that we are still voting on whether women and doctors are best equipped to make health care decisions — or politicians here in D. C." She also voted against restricting US funding for UN family planning programs.

Agriculture 
In March 2019, Murray was one of 38 senators to sign a letter to United States Secretary of Agriculture Sonny Perdue warning that dairy farmers "have continued to face market instability and are struggling to survive the fourth year of sustained low prices" and urging his department to "strongly encourage these farmers to consider the Dairy Margin Coverage program."

In June 2019, Murray and 18 other Democratic senators sent USDA Inspector General (IG) Phyllis K. Fong a letter requesting that the IG investigate USDA instances of retaliation and political decision-making and asserting that not to do so would mean these "actions could be perceived as a part of this administration’s broader pattern of not only discounting the value of federal employees, but suppressing, undermining, discounting, and wholesale ignoring scientific data produced by their own qualified scientists."

Environmental policy 
In October 2017, Murray was one of 19 senators to sign a letter to Administrator of the Environmental Protection Agency Scott Pruitt questioning Pruitt's decision to repeal the Clean Power Plan, asserting that the repeal's proposal used "mathematical sleights of hand to overstate the costs of industry compliance with the 2015 Rule and understate the benefits that will be lost if the 2017 repeal is finalized", and that denying science and fabricating math would fail to "satisfy the requirements of the law, nor will it slow the increase in frequency and intensity of extreme weather events, the inexorable rise in sea levels, or the other dire effects of global warming that our planet is already experiencing."

In February 2019, in response to reports of the EPA intending to decide against setting drinking water limits for perfluorooctane sulfonic acid (PFOS) and perfluorooctanoic acid (PFOA) as part of an upcoming national strategy to manage the aforementioned class of chemicals, Murray was one of 20 senators to sign a letter to Acting EPA Administrator Andrew R. Wheeler calling on the EPA "to develop enforceable federal drinking water standards for PFOA and PFOS, as well as institute immediate actions to protect the public from contamination from additional per- and polyfluoroalkyl substances (PFAS)."

Federal budget 
On December 10, 2013, Murray announced that she and Republican Representative Paul Ryan had reached a compromise agreement on a two-year, bipartisan budget bill, the Bipartisan Budget Act of 2013.

The deal was scheduled to be voted on first in the House and then the Senate. Some believed House Democrats would pass the deal as a way to reduce the sequester cuts, but the ranking Democrat on the House Budget Committee, Chris Van Hollen, said on December 12, 2013, that "members of his party are outraged that House Republicans are planning to adjourn without addressing unemployment benefits." Van Hollen said that "it is too early to say" whether a majority of House Democrats would vote for the budget bill. The deal was also unpopular with many conservatives.

Murray put the controversial intelligence ports-data project Global Trade Exchange into the Homeland Security budget.

Foreign relations

Central America 
In April 2019, Murray was one of 34 senators to sign a letter to President Trump, encouraging him "to listen to members of your own Administration and reverse a decision that will damage our national security and aggravate conditions inside Central America", asserting that Trump had "consistently expressed a flawed understanding of U.S. foreign assistance" since becoming president, and that he was "personally undermining efforts to promote U.S. national security and economic prosperity" through preventing the use of Fiscal Year 2018 national security funding. The senators argued that foreign assistance to Central American countries created less migration to the U.S., citing the funding's helping to improve conditions in those countries.

Myanmar 
Murray condemned the genocide of the Rohingya Muslim minority in Myanmar, and called for a stronger response to the crisis.

Russia 
In December 2010, Murray voted for the ratification of New START, a nuclear arms reduction treaty between the U.S. and the Russian Federation obliging both countries to have no more than 1,550 strategic warheads as well as 700 launchers deployed during the next seven years along with providing a continuation of on-site inspections that halted when START I expired the previous year. It was the first arms treaty with Russia in eight years.

In December 2018, after United States Secretary of State Mike Pompeo announced the Trump administration was suspending its obligations in the Intermediate-Range Nuclear Forces Treaty in 60 days in the event that Russia continued to violate the treaty, Murray was one of 26 senators to sign a letter expressing concern over the administration "now abandoning generations of bipartisan U.S. leadership around the paired goals of reducing the global role and number of nuclear weapons and ensuring strategic stability with America's nuclear-armed adversaries" and calling on Trump to continue arms negotiations.

Wars in Iraq and Afghanistan

In October 2002, Murray was one of 21 Democrats in the Senate to vote against the War Authorization for invading Iraq. Quoted from her Senate speech:
Mr. President, if we do take action in Iraq, there is no doubt that our armed forces will prevail. We will win a war with Iraq decisively, and, God willing, we will win it quickly. But what happens after the war? That will have as big an impact on our future peace and security. Will we be obligated to rebuild Iraq? If so, how? Our economy is reeling, our budget is in deficit, and we have no estimate of the cost of rebuilding. And with whom? As The New York Times columnist Tom Friedman points out, there's a retail store mentality that suggests to some—if "you break it, you buy it."

In December 2002, speaking to students at Columbia River High School in Vancouver, Murray made a number of remarks about Osama bin Laden as she attempted to explain why the US had such problems winning hearts and minds in the Muslim world, and how bin Laden had garnered support among some in the Middle East. Among other things, she said that bin Laden has "been out in these countries for decades, building schools, building roads, building infrastructure, building daycare facilities, building health care facilities, and the people are extremely grateful. He's made their lives better. We have not done that." This attracted attention from political opponents, who argued that this was inaccurate and constituted support for bin Laden.

Health care 
In 2014, Murray introduced legislation in the Senate called The Emergency Contraception Access and Education Act. The bill would require hospitals that receive federal funding to provide rape victims with emergency contraception. In July 2014, she introduced an amendment to a bill in the Senate to require health insurance plans to offer contraceptive coverage to patients regardless of employers' beliefs, religious or otherwise. Her amendment required 60 votes to move forward, and all but three Republicans voted against the measure.

In December 2018, Murray was one of 42 senators to sign a letter to Trump administration officials Alex Azar, Seema Verma, and Steve Mnuchin, arguing that the administration was improperly using Section 1332 of the Affordable Care Act to authorize states to "increase health care costs for millions of consumers, while weakening protections for individuals with pre-existing conditions". The senators requested the administration withdraw the policy and "re-engage with stakeholders, states, and Congress".

Labor 
In July 2019, Murray signed a letter to United States Secretary of Labor Alexander Acosta that advocated that the U.S. Occupational Safety and Health Administration initiate a full investigation into a complaint filed on May 20 by a group of Chicago-area employees of McDonald's that detailed workplace violence incidents, including interactions with customers such as customers throwing hot coffee and threatening employees with firearms. The senators argued that McDonald's could and must "do more to protect its employees, but employers will not take seriously their obligations to provide a safe workplace if OSHA does not enforce workers rights to a hazard-free workplace."

In response to a February 2021 report by the Congressional Budget Office on the effects of a minimum wage increase, Murray said: "Today's report makes clear what we've known all along: raising the minimum wage — which hasn't increased since 2009 — to $15 an hour isn't just the right thing to do, it's good policy." She was among the 42 Democrats to vote unsuccessfully to include a federal raise of the minimum wage to $15 per hour in the American Rescue Plan Act of 2021.

LGBTQ rights 
In 1996, Murray voted for the Defense of Marriage Act (DOMA), which banned federal recognition of same-sex marriage by limiting the definition of marriage to the union of a man and a woman. DOMA was ruled unconstitutional in 2015, and later in 2023, she reversed her previous position and spoke in support of the Respect for Marriage Act, which officially repealed DOMA.

In September 2014, Murray was one of 69 members of the House and Senate to sign a letter to then-Secretary of Health and Human Services Sylvia Burwell, requesting that the FDA revise its policy banning donation of corneas and other tissues by men who have had sex with another man in the preceding 5 years.

Beginning in 2016, in each meeting of congress, Murray and Ted Lieu (D-CA) have reintroduced the Therapeutic Fraud Prevention Act into the Senate and House. This bill, if passed, would prohibit, as an unfair and deceptive act or practice, commercial sexual orientation and gender identity conversion therapy.

Opioids 
In March 2017, Murray was one of 21 senators to sign a letter led by Ed Markey to Senate Majority Leader Mitch McConnell that noted that 12% of adult Medicaid beneficiaries had some form of substance abuse disorder, in addition to one third of treatment for opioid and other substance-use disorders in the United States being financed through Medicaid, and opined that the American Health Care Act could "very literally translate into a death spiral for those with opioid use disorders" due to the insurance coverage lacking adequate funds for care, often causing people to abandon treatment.

Other positions
In May 2006, Murray, along with 38 of 44 Senate Democrats, voted in favor of the Comprehensive Immigration Reform Act of 2006 (S. 2611). The bill includes provisions to improve border security, increases fines and other punishments for employers of illegal immigrants, and creates a guest worker program (which includes an almost doubling of the number of H-1B visas) and a path to citizenship for illegal immigrants already in the country. The bill, with support from some in the GOP leadership, passed 62-36.

Murray repeatedly cosponsored legislation to create the Wild Sky Wilderness area in the Washington Cascade Range. She eventually succeeded, with the bill signed by President George W. Bush on May 8, 2008. Murray has also supported legislation to increase the size of the Alpine Lakes Wilderness, also in the Washington Cascades.

On August 2, 2006, The New York Times wrote that, "In 1994, Senator Strom Thurmond of South Carolina was said to have engaged in excessive touching of his then-freshman colleague Patty Murray of Washington. The Seattle Post-Intelligencer reported that Murray asked for, and received, an apology. Through a spokeswoman, Murray declined to comment."

On January 30, 2008, Murray endorsed Hillary Clinton in the 2008 Democratic presidential primaries. One month later, the Washington Democratic caucus awarded two-thirds of its delegates to Barack Obama and one-third to Clinton. After Clinton's June 7 concession, Murray endorsed Obama.

On May 28, 2021, Murray abstained from voting on the creation of the January 6 commission. She cited a "personal family matter" for the abstention. Murray had expressed support for the commission and had talked about her experience on the day of the insurrection.

Veterans 
In August 2013, Murray was one of 23 Democratic senators to sign a letter to the Defense Department, warning of some payday lenders "offering predatory loan products to service members at exorbitant triple digit effective interest rates and loan products that do not include the additional protections envisioned by the law", and asserting that service members, along with their families, "deserve the strongest possible protections and swift action to ensure that all forms of credit offered to members of our armed forces are safe and sound".

In December 2018, Murray was one of 21 senators to sign a letter to United States Secretary of Veterans Affairs Robert Wilkie, calling it "appalling that the VA is not conducting oversight of its own outreach efforts", in spite of suicide prevention being the VA's highest clinical priority, and requesting Wilkie "consult with experts with proven track records of successful public and mental health outreach campaigns, with a particular emphasis on how those individuals measure success".

Electoral history

Personal life
Murray is married to Rob Murray and has two grown children: Sara and Randy. She lives on Whidbey Island.

See also
Women in the United States Senate

References

External links

 U.S. Senator Patty Murray official U.S. Senate website
 Patty Murray for Senate campaign website
 
 

|-

|-

|-

|-

|-

|-

|-

|-

|-

|-

|-

|-

|-

|-

|-

1950 births
Living people
20th-century American educators
20th-century American politicians
20th-century American women politicians
21st-century American politicians
21st-century American women politicians
American people of French-Canadian descent
American people of Irish descent
American people of Scottish descent
American people of Welsh descent
Schoolteachers from Washington (state)
Democratic Party United States senators from Washington (state)
Female United States senators
People from Bothell, Washington
People from Island County, Washington
Presidents pro tempore of the United States Senate
Democratic Party Washington (state) state senators
Washington State University alumni
Women state legislators in Washington (state)